The Tisza Dam, also known as the Kisköre Dam is a gravity dam on the Tisza River near Kisköre in Heves county, Hungary. It is the tallest dam in the country and also creates the largest reservoir in the country, Lake Tisza. It is a multi-purpose dam its purpose includes flood control and recreation. With a ship lock, it provides for navigation. Additionally, it supports a 28 MW hydroelectric power station, the largest in the country. Construction on the dam began in 1968 and it along with the power station were completed in 1973.

References

Dams in Hungary
Hydroelectric power stations in Hungary
Dams completed in 1973
Energy infrastructure completed in 1973
Buildings and structures in Heves County